The term Combined Services Detailed Interrogation Centre (CSDIC) was used for facilities in the UK, the continent (Belgium and Germany) between 1942 and 1947, the Middle East, and South Asia. They were run by the British War Office on a joint basis involving the British Army and various intelligence agencies, notably MI5 and MI9. The CSDICs on the European mainland were:

 a CSDIC at Diest in Belgium
 the Bad Nenndorf interrogation centre at Bad Nenndorf in Germany
CSDIC(I)-Z Section, at 49 St George's Drive, Pimlico, London
CSDIC(I)-X Section in Italy

They were originally established to interrogate detainees, defectors, and prisoners of war who were known or suspected to be working for Nazi Germany and Japan. After the war, suspected Soviet agents were also held for interrogation. The last CSDIC facility, the Bad Nenndorf interrogation centre, was closed down in June 1947. CSDIC(I) X and Z Sections were closed on 30 November 1945.

See also
 London Cage
 Camp 020
 CSDIC(I)
 Trent Park#Second World War - the "Cockfosters Cage"

Further reading 
 Oliver Hoare (ed.) Camp 020: MI5 and the Nazi Spies. Public Records Office.

External links 
 

Internments by the United Kingdom
United Kingdom intelligence community
Interrogations
Admiralty during World War II